Education Station is an American game show that was aired on Trinity Broadcasting Network. It was taped in Carnegie, Pennsylvania. The show is similar to Fox's Are You Smarter Than a 5th Grader?, but geared toward Christian educational entertainment. Produced by Greg Robbins, CEO of Uplifting Entertainment, Education Station is one of 11 television series created by the company since its 1999 foundation.

Format 
The show features four rounds of multiple choice questions from categories including English, Math, Science, History and the Bible. Teams of two faced off and any time a team lost a round, it was "gooped," which means a bucket of slime was dumped on team members' heads, or the team members received a pie in the face. Other aspects of the show include rolling the "dice of doom," "spill the beans" or "silly noodle."

References

External links 
 Trinity Broadcasting Network
 Uplifting Entertainment

Trinity Broadcasting Network original programming
Christian entertainment television series
2010s American game shows
2010 American television series debuts
Quiz shows